Hooked may refer to:

Literature
 Hooked (book) (1989), by Pauline Kael
 Hooked (2014), by Nir Eyal
 Hooked: Food, Free Will, and How the Food Giants Exploit Our Addictions (2021), by Michael Moss

Film and television
 Hooked (How I Met Your Mother), a 2010 episode of the CBS sitcom How I Met Your Mother
 "Hooked" (Law & Order: Special Victims Unit), an episode of Law & Order: Special Victims Unit
 Hooked: Illegal Drugs & How They Got That Way, a documentary on The History Channel
 Hooked, a documentary television mini-series on MSNBC
 Hooked (film), a 2008 Romanian film, also known as Pescuit Sportiv
 Hooked, an alternative name to a 1957 American film called Curfew Breakers

Music
 Hooked (Great White album), 1991
 Hooked (Lucy Woodward album), 2010
 Hooked (Vanilla Ice album)
 Hooked, an album by Voice Male
 Hooked, a 1990 album by The Brilliant Corners
 "Hooked", a song by Mary J. Blige
 "Hooked", a song by Why Don't We from the album 8 Letters

Other
 Hooked (horse) (foaled 30 October 2010), a champion Australia Thoroughbred racehorse
 Hooked (app), a mobile application for short stories
 Addiction

See also
 Hook (disambiguation)
 Hooking (disambiguation)